Bwncath ("buzzard") is a Welsh rock-folk or contemporary folk band from Caernarfon.

About 
The four-member band was formed in 2014.

He main singer, Elidyr Glyn, won the Alun Sbardun Huws trophy in the Eisteddfod Genedlaethol 2016 for composing the song Curiad Y Dydd. Glyn  is also known for winning Cân i Gymru ("Song for Wales") in 2019, with the song Fel Hyn 'Da Ni Fod.

Bwncath was described as one of the highlights of "Fel 'Na Mai" ("That's how it is") rock festival in Pembrokeshire. They also headlined Saturday in Tafwyl in 2022. 

The band were described as the busiest and one of the most popular bands in Wales in 2022, easily performing over 100 giggs across the country and booked to perform every weekend until July 2023.

Members 

 Elidyr Glyn - main voice, guitar
 Robin Llwyd - electric guitar
 Alun Williams - base guitar
 Twm Ellis - drums

Performances 
Bwncath has performed live in a variety of events across Wales including, Eisteddfod yr Urdd, Caernarfon Food Festival, Gŵyl Rhuthun, and Gŵyl Fach y Fro, to name a few. They have also appeared on Noson Lawen on S4C.

Label 
Bwncath music is published via the label Rasal.

Albums 
 Bwncath (2017)
 Bwncath - II (2020)

Singles 
 Fel Hyn 'Da Ni Fod (2019)
 Clywed Dy Lais (2019)

External links 

 YouTube Mix of songs

References 

Welsh-language bands